Langkamp is a German surname. Notable people with the surname include:

Matthias Langkamp (born 1984), German footballer
Sebastian Langkamp (born 1988), German footballer, brother of Matthias

German-language surnames